Kaviyam is a 1994 Tamil-language drama film directed by M. Ponraj. The film stars newcomer Ruban George and Nandhini, with newcomers Salomon, Thamizhan, M. Ponraj and Vennira Aadai Moorthy playing supporting roles. It was released on 18 February 1994.

Plot

The film begins with the cancellation of a wedding. The bride Shanthi (Nandhini) refuses to marry the groom Kumar (Salomon) who wanted a large dowry and she humiliates him. Shanthi and Kumar are doctors in the same hospital. Shanthi challenges him to marry a better groom who will not ask her any dowry. Raja (Ruban George) is a villager who comes to the city searching for work. In town, Raja befriends Vaithi (M. Ponraj) and Vaithi accommodates him in his lodge. One night, Raja finds an old man who gets struck by lightning and he brings that old man to his daughter Shanthi but the old man dies on the way. Thereafter, Raja becomes a traffic police and he falls in love with Shanthi. When Raja expresses his love to Shanthi, she rejects it. Shanthi slowly develops a soft corner for the kind-hearted Raja. What transpires later forms the crux of the story.

Cast

Ruban George as Raja
Nandhini as Shanthi
Salomon as Kumar
Thamizhan as Santhanam
M. Ponraj as Vaithi
Vennira Aadai Moorthy
Thayir Vadai Desikan
Kambar Jayaraman as Shanthi's grandfather
Brinda
Beena
Sulakshana
Kanal Kannan

Soundtrack

The film score and the soundtrack were composed by the film director M. Ponraj. The soundtrack, released in 1994, features 5 tracks with lyrics written by Salomon.

Reception
Malini Mannath wrote for The Indian Express that the film "turns out to be not so bad after all". Thulasi of Kalki wrote having a beautiful knot of love story between doctor and traffic cop, in every scene, there's laziness instead of speed, there's traffic in the place of emotional space.

References

1994 films
1990s Tamil-language films
1994 directorial debut films